A colliding-wind binary is a binary star system in which the two members are massive stars that emit powerful, radiatively-driven stellar winds. The location where these two winds collide produces a strong shock front that can cause radio, X-ray and possibly synchrotron radiation emission. Wind compression in the bow shock region between the two stellar winds allows dust formation. When this dust streams away from the orbiting pair, it can form a pinwheel nebula of spiraling dust. Such pinwheels have been observed in the Quintuplet Cluster

The high orbital eccentricity of the pair allows astronomers to observe changes in the colliding wind region as their separation varies. Another prominent example of a colliding-wind binary is thought to be Eta Carinae, one of the most luminous objects in the Milky Way galaxy. The first colliding-wind binary to be detected in the X-ray band outside
the Milky Way galaxy was HD 5980, located in the Small Magellanic Cloud.

See also
 Struve-Sahade effect

References